This is a list of Estonian television related events from 1956.

Events

Debuts
11 March - Aktuaalne kaamera (or, simply AK), Estonian-language news programme. Eesti Televisioon (ETV).

Television shows

Ending this year

Births
9 June - Guido Kangur, actor
27 July - Reet Oja (:et), journalist

Deaths